The 1982 season in Swedish football, starting January 1982 and ending December 1982:

Events 
 19 May 1982: IFK Göteborg—led by Sven-Göran Eriksson—defeats Hamburger SV on Volksparkstadion, Hamburg, 3–0 and wins the 1982 UEFA Cup trophy with 4–0 on aggregate after a 1–0 win on Ullevi in the first final on 5 May 1982. This is the first ever European trophy won by a Swedish club. IFK had defeated FC Haka, SK Sturm Graz, FC Dinamo București, Valencia CF and 1. FC Kaiserslautern on the way to the final.

Honours

Official titles

Competitions

Promotions, relegations and qualifications

Promotions

Relegations

International qualifications

Domestic results

Allsvenskan 1982

Allsvenskan play-off 1982 
Quarter-finals

Semi-finals

Final

Allsvenskan qualification play-off 1982

Division 2 Norra 1982

Division 2 Södra 1982

Division 2 qualification play-off 1982 
1st round

2nd round

Svenska Cupen 1981–82 
Final

National team results

Notes

References 
Print

Online

 
Seasons in Swedish football